The 1976 Toyota Tamaraws season was the second season of the franchise in the Philippine Basketball Association (PBA).

Names and colors

Toyota Comets (First and Second conferences)
   (dark)
    (light)

Toyota Silver Tamaraws (All-Philippine Championship)
   (dark)
   (light)

NOTE: Toyota changed their monicker from the Comets to the Silver Tamaraws during the 1976 PBA Second Conference Finals, but would still wear the Comets uniform used during the first and second conferences of the 1976 season.

Off-season transactions

Finals stint
Toyota placed runner-up to Crispa in all three contested championships for the season. In the first conference finals, the Comets won the series opener but were beaten three straight by the Redmanizers. 

In the second conference, Crispa and Toyota meet again in the final series. The Redmanizers took the first two games but the Silver Tamaraws avoided a sweep by taking the third game.  Two nights later on November 18, Crispa clinch its third straight crown with a 3-1 series victory.

In the All-Philippine championship, Toyota led the series, two games to none, but Crispa came back and win the final three games to capture the league's first Grandslam as the Tamaraws ended up bridesmaid for the third time in the year and had lost to their archrivals in the last four conferences.

Roster

References

Toyota Super Corollas seasons
Toyota